Corner-Straits chain of lakes is a  chain of lakes that is located at the tri-county corner of Delta County, Michigan,  Alger and Schoolcraft countries in the Hiawatha National Forest.  The chain consists of Skeels Lake, Corner Lake, Deep Lake, and Straits Lake.  Other nearby lakes include Hugaboom Lake, Blue Lake,  Ironjaw Lake, Ostrander Lake, Toms Lake and Round Lake.

See also
List of lakes in Michigan

References 

Lakes of Schoolcraft County, Michigan
Lakes of Alger County, Michigan
Lakes of Delta County, Michigan
Lakes of Michigan